Aphanus rolandri is a species of dirt-colored seed bug in the family Rhyparochromidae, found in the Palearctic.

Subspecies
These four subspecies belong to the species Aphanus rolandri:
 Aphanus rolandri angustulus (Reuter, 1880)
 Aphanus rolandri nitidulus (Reuter, 1885)
 Aphanus rolandri opacus (Reuter, 1885)
 Aphanus rolandri rolandri Linnaeus, 1758

References

External links

 

Rhyparochromidae
Taxa named by Carl Linnaeus
Bugs described in 1758
Palearctic insects